The Roman Catholic Diocese of Kalisz is a diocese located in the city of Kalisz in the ecclesiastical province of Poznań in Poland.

History
 25 March 1992: Established as the Diocese of Kalisz from the Diocese of Częstochowa, Metropolitan Archdiocese of Wrocław and Metropolitan Archdiocese of Gniezno
 25 June 2020: Pope Francis relieves Bishop Edward Janiak, age 67, of his responsibilities while he is investigating on charges of protecting "predator priests" who committed acts of sex abuse. On October 17, 2020, Pope Francis permanently removed Janiak as Bishop of Kalisz.

Special churches

Minor Basilicas:
 Bazylika Matki Bożej Wspomożenia Wiernych, Twardogóra
 Bazylika św. Józefa, Kalisz (Basilica of St Joseph)

Bishops

Ordinaries

 Bishop Stanisław Napierała (25 March 1992 – 21 July 2012)
 Bishop Edward Janiak (21 July 2012 – 17 October 2020)
Apostolic Administrator Grzegorz Ryś (25 June 2020 – 11 February 2021)
 Bishop Damian Bryl (11 February 2021 – present)

Auxiliary Bishops
Teofil Józef Wilski (1995–2011)
Łukasz Mirosław Buzun, O.S.P.P.E. (2014–present)

See also
Roman Catholicism in Poland

References

External links
 GCatholic.org
 Catholic Hierarchy
 

Roman Catholic dioceses in Poland
Christian organizations established in 1992
Kalisz
Roman Catholic dioceses and prelatures established in the 20th century